Meza gardineri is a butterfly in the family Hesperiidae. It is found in Zambia.

References

Butterflies described in 2008
Erionotini